The third series of the British sitcom series 'Allo 'Allo! contains six episodes which first aired between 5 December 1986, and 9 January 1987.

Series 3 features the last appearance of Francesca Gonshaw as Maria Recamier.

The following episode names are the ones found on the British R2 DVDs with alternate region titles given below them.

Cast

Episodes

References

External links

1986 British television seasons
1987 British television seasons
 3
'Allo 'Allo! seasons